Wolsztyn railway station is a railway station serving the town of Wolsztyn, in the Greater Poland Voivodeship, Poland. The station opened on 1 June 1886 and is located on the Sulechów–Luboń koło Poznania railway, Leszno–Zbąszyń railway and the closed Wolsztyn–Zagan railway. The train services are operated by Koleje Wielkopolskie.

History
The first building was built in 1886. It was completely destroyed on 1 September 1939, and was only fit for demolition. A new station was built and opened in 1961.

Train services
The station is served by the following service(s):

Regional services (KW) Wolsztyn - Grodzisk Wielkopolski - Poznan
Regional services (KW) Zbaszynek - Zbaszyn - Wolsztyn - Boszkowo - Leszno

Wolsztyn Roundhouse

Near the railway station is Wolsztyn Roundhouse, built in 1907 and enlarged in 1909, it has 4 positions for steam locomotives. An interesting element of the station is the water tower to 1907.

There is a steam festival every year at the end of April or start of May.

References

 This article is based upon a translation of the Polish language version as of May 2016.

External links
 

Railway stations in Poland opened in 1886
Railway stations in Greater Poland Voivodeship